Examinetics, Inc. is a provider of mobile and on-site occupational health screening and data management services in the United States.  The company was established in 2004 following the consolidation of a number of small businesses providing occupational health screening and compliance services.

Examinetics, headquartered in Overland Park, Kansas, operates more than 125 mobile screening units to provide medical surveillance testing and reporting services to US industrial and governmental companies and organizations in over 16,000 locations across the US.

Operations
Examinetics is a US-based provider of occupational health screening, surveillance and compliance services.  Since its inception in 2004, the company has undertaken a number of strategic acquisitions including that of Industrial Health in 2006.

Key management personnel include Paul Fenaroli (Chairman, CEO & President), Gary Gluzberg (Chief Commercial Officer) and Hank Stratmeier (Chief Operating Officer).  

Examinetics employs over 300 staff from various technical and professional disciplines including nurses, medical assistants, certified X-ray technologists and audiologists, the majority of whom operate from the Examinetics fleet of mobile screening stations.  They are responsible for carrying out nearly one million screening tests each year for more than 3,000 corporate customers, nationally.

Services
In order to facilitate compliance with certain regulations and laws under the Occupational Safety and Health Act, Examinetics developed occupational health screening, compliance and wellness programs that are delivered from their fleet of mobile occupational health screening units and their online occupational health data management and reporting system known as the Examination Management Network (XM Network).

Mobile screening units
Monitoring employees in accordance with statutory guidelines is usually undertaken 'offsite' at local hospitals or clinics or 'onsite' by occupational health professionals within the organization or by external subcontractors.  Examinetics operates mobile occupational health screening units to provide screening and medical testing at the workplace.

The Examination Management Network (XM Network)
Examinetics developed the XM Network, a secure online data management and reporting system, for occupational health professionals and employers.  With XM Network, the company achieved its objective to establish a "data interchange standard for the occupational health industry".  With data derived from occupational health screening tests, XM Network allows various reporting options enabling employers to manage, import, interpret and export data in order to produce occupational health reports for their organizations.  The system is used in conjunction with the screening undertaken in the mobile units and was developed, in accordance with security and privacy of health data, to be fully compliant with the US Health Insurance Portability and Accountability Act (HIPAA).

OccHealth Search
In 2008, Examinetics developed a semantic web tool called "OccHealth Search" - a search facility for occupational health professionals (OccHealth Search tool) which coincided with a re-launch of their main website.  The company's strategy was for the website and OccHealth search tool to become the leading search portal for the global occupational health industry whilst providing educational support and quality search results for students and general searchers interested in occupational health issues.

References

Occupational safety and health